Lisa Raymond (born August 10, 1973) is an American retired professional tennis player who has achieved notable success in doubles tennis. Raymond has eleven Grand Slam titles to her name: six in women's doubles and five in mixed doubles. On June 12, 2000, she reached the world No. 1 ranking in doubles for the first time, becoming the 13th player to reach the milestone. Raymond was ranked No. 1 on five separate occasions in her career over a combined total of 137 weeks (the fourth-highest mark of all time) and finished as the year-end No. 1 doubles player in both 2001 and 2006. She currently holds the record of most doubles match wins (860) and most doubles matches played (1,206) in WTA history, and earned more than $10 million in prize money in her career.

She is one of the few players to win a 'Career Grand Slam' in doubles, which she accomplished after winning the 2006 French Open title. Among her former doubles partners are Lindsay Davenport, Martina Navratilova, Rennae Stubbs, Samantha Stosur, Květa Peschke, Cara Black and Liezel Huber. Raymond is also an Olympic medalist, having won the bronze medal in the mixed-doubles competition at the 2012 Summer Olympics for the US team, partnering with Mike Bryan. She reached a total of 122 WTA doubles finals and won 79 titles (sixth-most in history); Raymond also won a doubles title every single year between 1993 and 2012, a span of 20 years.

Despite being best known for her doubles prowess, Raymond also achieved moderate success in singles, winning four titles (finishing runner-up on eight other occasions) and reached a career-high of world No. 15 in October 1997. She reached the second week of a Grand Slam eight times, with her best results being two quarterfinal appearances at the 2000 Wimbledon Championships and the 2004 Australian Open, and six separate fourth round finishes. During her singles career, Raymond recorded wins over former world-number-ones Venus Williams, Arantxa Sánchez Vicario, Monica Seles, Jennifer Capriati and Martina Hingis, as well as other accomplished former top 10 players such as Amanda Coetzer, Magdalena Maleeva, Brenda Schultz-McCarthy, Lori McNeil, Zina Garrison-Jackson, Nathalie Tauziat, Irina Spîrlea, Natasha Zvereva, Conchita Martínez, Marion Bartoli, Svetlana Kuznetsova, Maria Kirilenko, Elena Dementieva, Daniela Hantuchová, and Dinara Safina. In February 2007 she decided to retire from playing singles, instead choosing to focus on her doubles career.

Career

Early years
Born in Norristown, Pennsylvania, Raymond is a 1991 graduate of The Academy of Notre Dame de Namur, a private Catholic girls school in Villanova, Pennsylvania. She received an athletic scholarship to attend the University of Florida in Gainesville, Florida, where she played for coach Andy Brandi's Florida Gators women's tennis team. As a Gator, she won the NCAA singles title in 1992 and 1993 and led the Gators to their first NCAA national team championship in 1992. She was the first player to win all three collegiate Grand Slam titles in a single season (1992). She received the 1992 Rookie of the Year award, the 1992 Tennis Magazine Collegiate Player of the Year award, and twice received the Honda Sports Award for Tennis, recognizing her as the outstanding collegiate female tennis player of the year in 1991/92 and in 1992/93.

As a junior, Raymond won five U.S. National (USTA) singles and doubles titles, and she was ranked No. 1 in the U.S. for players 18-and Under in 1990. She was inducted into the University of Florida Athletic Hall of Fame as a "Gator Great" in 2003.

2005–2007
Played the first half of the year with Rennae Stubbs before beginning a partnership with Samantha Stosur, winning the US Open, her second doubles crown at Flushing Meadows, and the season-ending championships, also her second. Raymond and Stosur won six titles together and were named ITF World Doubles Champions of 2005.

In 2006, Raymond and Stosur won ten titles including the French Open and their second season-ending championships. By winning the French Open, Lisa Raymond became only the 13th person in history to have won all four doubles Grand Slam tournaments. They finished the year as the co-holders of the number-one spot, and won a WTA-leading ten titles. Raymond and Stosur were again awarded by the ITF as World Doubles Champions of 2006. They also received the WTA Team of the Year award for their achievements.

The year 2007 was a good one for Raymond and Stosur, with the pair winning five titles; also that year, Lisa decided to retire from her singles career. However, Stosur was diagnosed with a virus, forcing her to miss the second half of the season meaning Raymond had to play with various partners. Even though they only played half the season together, they had still qualified for the season-ending championships but could not compete.

2008–2009
Raymond began 2008 playing with Elena Likhovtseva with solid results but was cut short due to injury but then reunited with former partner Sam Stosur in May, after the latter's return from injury. They went on to reach the finals of Wimbledon and the US Open, losing both. Raymond also won titles in Memphis and New Haven.

In 2009, Raymond began a partnership with Květa Peschke, where they reached four finals and two semifinals before their year was cut short by an injury to Peschke, just before Wimbledon. Lisa played with different partners, winning one title, taking her tally to 68.

Raymond now considers her 2008–2009 seasons to be almost 'lost' due to a lack of drive in her fitness.

2010
Raymond started the year by reuniting with former partner Rennae Stubbs. They lost their first round in Sydney, before reaching the semi-finals of the Australian Open, as the No. 6 seeds, losing to Venus and Serena Williams. Raymond also made the semifinals of the mixed-doubles tournament. Raymond and Stubbs won the Eastbourne International against Květa Peschke and Katarina Srebotnik in the final, 6–2, 2–6 [13–11].
Both Raymond and Stubbs qualified for the WTA Tour Championships at Doha to face second seeds Peschke and Srebotnik.

2011
Raymond started the year by teaming up with Julia Görges but in April started a new partnership with Liezel Huber. Starting slowly, by May their results picked up with a quarterfinal showing in Warsaw, semifinals at Roland Garros and Birmingham, runners-up in Eastbourne and Stanford. They were also quarter-finalists at Wimbledon and Cincinnati. They won their first tournament in Toronto and then claimed the US Open and Tokyo, with a semifinal finish in Beijing which qualified them for the WTA Championships in Istanbul. Both have stated they want to continue their partnership in 2012 and hopefully play the London Olympics. Raymond has now won six women's Grand Slam doubles titles, three at the US Open, bringing her grand total to nine (three in mixed) and 73 doubles titles in total.

2012
In Raymond's first tournament of the year at Sydney, she and her partner Huber were second seeds, and got to the final. The final against top seeds Peschke and Srebotnik was very close with the first two sets shared. In the deciding third set, the top seeds won 13–11. In the Australian Open, Raymond and Huber got to the quarterfinals without dropping a set but narrowly lost their quarterfinal match to Mirza and Vesnina in the deciding third-set tiebreaker. Raymond and Huber won the next four tournaments which were in Paris, Doha, Dubai and Indian Wells. In Paris, they were the top seeds. Grönefeld and Martić were beaten in the final, in straight sets. In Doha, Raymond and Huber defeated Kops and Spears, in straight sets. In Dubai, they got revenge for their Australian Open defeat to Mirza and Vesnina by beating them in straight sets.  At Indian Wells, Raymond and Huber beat Mirza and Vesnina in straight sets. At Wimbledon, as the No. 1 seeds, they lost to eventual champions, Serena and Venus Williams. Raymond's last tournament of the year was the Masters Cup. Her partner in the doubles was Huber. They got to the semifinals losing to Andrea Hlaváčková and Lucie Hradecká, in straight sets.

2013
Raymond started the year ranked No. 6 in doubles. Her first tournament was with partner Maria Kirilenko in Sydney, where they were seeded third. They beat Marina Erakovic and Ekaterina Makarova in straight sets in the first round, but then lost in straight sets to Darija Jurak and Katalin Marosi.

Next, Raymond and Kirilenko played at the Australian Open, where they were seeded No. 3. They were beaten in straight sets in the second round by the Australian duo of 16-year-old Ashleigh Barty (who was playing with a wildcard) and Casey Dellacqua, who later went on to reach the final. After the Australian Open, she dropped to No. 7, being overtaken in the rankings by her partner Maria Kirilenko.

In February, Raymond teamed up with Sam Stosur to play at the Doha tournament, where they were unseeded and beat eighth seeds Bethanie Mattek-Sands and Sania Mirza in straight sets, then beat Janette Husárová and Zhang Shuai 2-1 sets, but lost in the quarterfinals against third seeded Raquel Kops-Jones and Abigail Spears, in straight sets.

Next, in March, Raymond played in Miami, where she teamed up with British teenager Laura Robson (who was playing with a wildcard). They reached the semifinals, where they beat 1st seeds and world No. 1 pair, Errani and Vinci, in straight sets with the loss of just three games, but then lost in straight sets against third seeds Nadia Petrova and Katarina Srebotnik in the final. This partnership continued into the 2013 Wimbledon tournament.

2014
Raymond started the year ranked 42 in doubles. She reached the final of her first tournament of the year, Hobart, with Zhang Shuai as her partner. They narrowly lost to Monica Niculescu and Clara Zakopalová. In the Australian Open, she partnered with Hantuchová. They reached the third round and got knocked out by Makarova and Vesnina. At Nuremberg, she got as far as semifinal with Huber as her partner. The same pair lost to eventual French Open champions Hsieh and Peng in the third round. At Wimbledon, Raymond and Huber were seeded 15th but lost in the second round. In the US Open, Raymond teamed up with King, and they got to the third round before losing to the eventual tournament winners, Makarova and Vesnina. Raymond's best result in the mixed doubles was a second-round exit at the Australian Open with Mariusz Fyrstenberg from Poland as her partner. In the French Open and US Open, she lost in the first round with Peers and Lipsky, respectively.

Grand Slam finals

Doubles: 13 (6–7)

Mixed doubles: 10 (5–5)

WTA Tour Championships

Doubles: 4 titles

Olympic finals

Doubles: 1 bronze medal match (0–1)

WTA career finals

Singles: 12 (4–8)

Doubles: 122 (79–43)

Team events

Fed Cup
Country: USA
Years participated: 1997, 1998, 2000, 2002, 2003, 2004, 2007, 2008
Best result: Winning team 2000

Overall record: 14–9
Singles record: 3–6
Doubles record: 11–3

Hopman Cup
Country: USA
Years participated: 2006
Best result: Winning team 2006 (w/Taylor Dent)

Overall record: 3–4
Singles record: 0–4
Mixed doubles record: 3–0

Olympics
Country: USA
Years Participated: 2004
Best Result: Doubles Quarter-Finalist (w/Navratilova), Singles 3rd Round

Overall Record: 3–2
Singles Record: 2–1
Doubles Record: 1–1

Performance timelines

Singles

Doubles

Mixed doubles

See also

 Florida Gators
 List of Florida Gators tennis players
 List of Olympic medalists in tennis
 List of University of Florida Olympians
List of University of Florida Athletic Hall of Fame members

References

External links

 
 
 
 Lisa Raymond website

1973 births
Living people
Lesbian sportswomen
LGBT tennis players
American LGBT sportspeople
American female tennis players
Australian Open (tennis) champions
Florida Gators women's tennis players
French Open champions
Hopman Cup competitors
People from Norristown, Pennsylvania
Tennis people from Pennsylvania
Tennis players at the 2004 Summer Olympics
US Open (tennis) champions
Wimbledon champions
Tennis players at the 2012 Summer Olympics
Olympic bronze medalists for the United States in tennis
Grand Slam (tennis) champions in women's doubles
Grand Slam (tennis) champions in mixed doubles
Medalists at the 2012 Summer Olympics
LGBT people from Pennsylvania
WTA number 1 ranked doubles tennis players
ITF World Champions